The Gare de Blangy-sur-Bresle (Blangy-sur-Bresle Station) is a railway station in the commune of Blangy-sur-Bresle in the Seine-Maritime department, France. The station is served by TER Hauts-de-France trains from Beauvais to Le Tréport-Mers.

See also 
 List of SNCF stations in Normandy

References

Railway stations in Seine-Maritime